Lughat Al Arab (Arabic: The Language of the Arabs) was a monthly linguistic and history magazine which was published in Baghdad between 1911 and 1931 with a twelve-year interruption.

History and profile
Lughat Al Arab was launched by the Carmelite Father Anastas Al Karmali in Baghdad in 1911. It was published in Baghdad on a monthly basis. The magazine featured articles on language, history and literature. Al Karmali edited the magazine. The last issue appeared in June 1914. Al Karmali was sent to exile in Anatolia in 1916, and following his return to Baghdad Lughat Al Arab was restarted in 1926, but it permanently folded in 1931. In this second period Kazim Al Dujayli and Iraqi linguist and historian Muhammad Bahjat Athari were among the contributors of Lughat Al Arab.

References

1911 establishments in the Ottoman Empire
Arabic-language magazines
Defunct magazines published in Iraq
Defunct literary magazines
History magazines
Magazines established in 1911
Magazines disestablished in 1931
Mass media in Baghdad
Monthly magazines